The white-tailed ant thrush (Neocossyphus poensis), also known as the white-tailed rufous thrush, is a species of bird in the family Turdidae. It is found in Angola, Cameroon, Central African Republic, Republic of the Congo, Democratic Republic of the Congo, Ivory Coast, Equatorial Guinea, Gabon, Ghana, Guinea, Kenya, Liberia, Nigeria, Sierra Leone, Tanzania, Togo, and Uganda. Its natural habitat is subtropical or tropical moist lowland forests.

References

white-tailed ant thrush
Birds of the Gulf of Guinea
Birds of Central Africa
Birds of West Africa
Birds described in 1844
Taxonomy articles created by Polbot